Edenton is a town in, and the county seat of, Chowan County, North Carolina, United States, on Albemarle Sound. The population was 4,397 at the 2020 census. Edenton is located in North Carolina's Inner Banks region. In recent years Edenton has become a popular retirement location and a destination for heritage tourism.

Edenton served as the second official capital of North Carolina, during the colonial era as the Province of North Carolina, though other than housing the governor's official residence, it did not otherwise house any other governmental functions. It served as capital from 1722 to 1743, when it was moved to Brunswick. The town was the site of the Edenton Tea Party, a protest organized by several Edenton women in 1774 in solidarity with the organizers of the Boston Tea Party. It was the birthplace of Harriet Jacobs, an enslaved African American whose 1861 autobiography, Incidents in the Life of a Slave Girl, is now considered an American classic. Edenton gained notoriety for a famous wrongful conviction during the Satanic panic era of the late twentieth century. Today, Edenton's local economy is primarily driven by tourism, and as a popular retirement location.

History

Edenton Colony
Edenton Colony was the first permanent European settlement in what is now the state of North Carolina.

Edenton was established in 1712 as "the Towne on Queen Anne's Creek". It was later known as "Ye Towne on Mattercommack Creek" and still later as "the Port of Roanoke". It was renamed "Edenton" and incorporated in 1722 in honor of Governor Charles Eden, who had died that year.

Historic Edenton
Edenton served as the second capital of the Province of North Carolina, from 1722 to 1743, with the governor establishing his residence there and the population increasing during that period.

William Byrd II, who visited the town in March 1729, provides a description of Edenton in his The History of the Dividing Line:
This town is Situated on the north side of Albermarle Sound which is there about 5 miles over. A Dirty Slash runs all along the Back of it, which in the Summer is a foul annoyance, and furnishes abundance of that Carolina plague, musquetas. There may be 40 or 50 Houses, most of them Small, built without Expense. A Citizen here is counted Extravagant, if he has Ambition enough to aspire to a Brick-chimney. Justice herself is but indifferently Lodged, the Court-House having much the Air of a Common Tobacco-House. I believe this is the only metropolis in the Christian or Mohametan world where there is neither Church, Chapel, Mosque, Synagogue, nor any other Place of Publick Worship of any Sect or Religion whatsoever. What little Devotion there may be is much more private than their vices. 

A landmark in women's history occurred in Edenton in 1774. Fifty-one women in Edenton, led by Penelope Barker, signed a protest petition agreeing to boycott English tea and other products, in what became known, decades later, as the Edenton Tea Party. The Edenton Tea Party is the first known political action by women in the British American colonies. In fact it so shocked London that newspapers published etchings depicting the women as uncontrollable. Her home, the Barker House, is open seven days a week, without a fee, and is considered by many as Edenton's living room.

Joseph Hewes, a resident of Edenton and successful owner of a merchant marine fleet, was appointed the first Secretary of the Navy in 1776. John Adams said that Hewes "laid the foundation, the cornerstone of the American Navy." Hewes also signed the United States Declaration of Independence.

James Iredell, also of Edenton, was at 38 the youngest member of the first United States Supreme Court. He was appointed by George Washington. His son James Iredell Jr., served as the Democratic-Republican governor of North Carolina and then became a United States senator. His home may be toured through the Historic Edenton Visitors Center.

Easy sea access halted with a 1795 hurricane which silted Roanoke Inlet. Completion of the 1805 Dismal Swamp Canal took business elsewhere by diverting shipping to Norfolk, Virginia. Locals rejected construction of a railroad, a lack that impeded the local economy.

Supreme Court Justice James Wilson, a signer of both the Declaration of Independence and the United States Constitution, died in Edenton on August 21, 1798, at age 55, while riding his judicial circuit.

Harriet Jacobs and her brother John were born into slavery in Edenton in 1813 and 1815, respectively. They, and later Harriet's children, were baptized at St.Paul's. Their early childhood was centered around Horniblow's tavern, the town's only colonial hotel, on the northern side of East King Street, just west of Chowan County Courthouse. Twelve-year old John Jacobs was sold at public auction in 1828, probably at Market House (junction Water Street / Broad Street). Both siblings became enslaved to an abusive master, the local physician, Dr. James Norcom, living with him at his house on West Eden Street. In 1835, Harriet Jacobs went into hiding in the house of her grandmother, a freedwoman, on the northern side of West King Street, a few steps from Broad Street. She famously had to stay there concealed in a crawl space for seven years before she was finally able to escape to New York, where she wrote Incidents in the Life of a Slave Girl, now considered an "American classic".

In 1862, during the Civil War, the Albemarle Artillery was recruited at Edenton by a local attorney named William Badham Jr. Its guns were cast from bronze bells taken from courthouse and churches in the Edenton area. Known as the Edenton Bell Battery, its four howitzers were named the Columbia, St. Paul, Fannie Roulac, and Edenton. Two of the guns, the St. Paul and Edenton, have been returned to Edenton and can now be seen at Edenton's waterfront park.

Edenton enjoyed an economic revival beginning in 1890 led by lumbering, an 1898 cotton mill, and a 1909 peanut-processing plant.

Edenton is the home of the 1886 Roanoke River Lighthouse. The lighthouse is called a screw-pile design because of its original support system. Each piling was literally screwed into the river or sound bottom so they would not pull out in heavy storms and hurricanes. The Roanoke River Lighthouse, now located at Edenton, is believed to be the last extant example in the United States of a rectangular frame building built for a screw-pile base. The lighthouse was in commission from 1887 until 1941.

Edenton is home to numerous early houses and public buildings, including the Cupola House. It was designated a National Historic Landmark in 1970, a designation also accorded the 1776 Chowan County Courthouse. The courthouse is still used for official court events. The city is home to the oldest house still in existence in North Carolina, constructed in 1719 before the establishment of the city.

Edenton achieved international notoriety for the Little Rascals Day Care sexual abuse case, the subject of journalist Ofra Bikel's award-winning trilogy of documentaries: Innocence Lost (1991), Innocence Lost: The Verdict (1993), and Innocence Lost: The Plea (1997).

Geography
Edenton is located in southern Chowan County at  (36.0608, −76.6083). It sits at the north end of Edenton Bay, just north of the confluence of the Chowan and Roanoke rivers, which forms Albemarle Sound.

U.S. Route 17, a four-lane expressway, runs along the northern border of the town, with access from five exits. US 17 leads northeast  to Elizabeth City and southwest  to Williamston.

Climate

Demographics

2020 census

As of the 2020 United States census, there were 4,460 people, 2,084 households, and 1,177 families residing in the town.

2000 census
As of the census of 2000, there were 5,394 people, 1,983 households, and 1,294 families residing in the town. The population density was 1,076.3 people per square mile (415.7/km2). There were 2,204 housing units at an average density of 439.8 per square mile (169.9/km2). The racial makeup of the town was 42.86% White, 55.23% African American, 0.20% Native American, 0.63% Asian, 0.02% Pacific Islander, 0.44% from other races, and 0.61% from two or more races. Hispanic or Latino of any race were 1.45% of the population.

There were 1,983 households, out of which 30.0% had children under the age of 18 living with them, 38.0% were married couples living together, 24.7% had a female householder with no husband present, and 34.7% were non-families. 31.4% of all households were made up of individuals, and 16.4% had someone living alone who was 65 years of age or older. The average household size was 2.37 and the average family size was 2.95.

In the town, the population was spread out, with 23.7% under the age of 18, 14.3% from 18 to 24, 21.3% from 25 to 44, 20.2% from 45 to 64, and 20.5% who were 65 years of age or older. The median age was 37 years. For every 100 females there were 78.2 males. For every 100 females age 18 and over, there were 71.4 males.

The median income for a household in the town was $25,241, and the median income for a family was $34,132. Males had a median income of $27,192 versus $18,281 for females. The per capita income for the town was $13,264. About 20.3% of families and 25.1% of the population were below the poverty line, including 34.1% of those under age 18 and 20.1% of those age 65 or over.

Culture

Located in northeastern North Carolina, Edenton is a small unique town known for its authentic 18th-, 19th- and early 20th-century architecture and the stories about the people behind these public buildings and homes. The Lane House dates from 1719 and may be the oldest house in the state of North Carolina. Edenton played a key role in the development of the colonies, the state and the nation. The Cupola House, a registered National Historic Landmark, was built by Francis Corbin in 1758 on the waterfront at Edenton where it stands today. The 1767 Chowan County Courthouse, another National Historic Landmark, has been used since its construction. The Barker House, home of Penelope Barker, the organizer of the first political action by women in the colonies, is operated as a house museum and to interpret colonial history. The home of James Iredell Sr. is in Edenton and operated as a North Carolina Historic Site.

Churches

Edenton has many religious institutions. Some of the churches in the community include:

St Annes Catholic Church c. 1821
First Presbyterian Church of Edenton c. 1946
Edenton United Methodist Church
Open Door Church
St. Paul's Episcopal Church, built c. 1736
Edenton Baptist Church
Macedonia Baptist Church
Kadesh African Methodist Episcopal Zion Church

Sports
For two years, 1951 and 1952, Edenton's Historic Hicks Field was home to a professional minor league baseball team. The Edenton Colonials played in the Class D Virginia League in 1951 and the Class D Coastal Plain League in 1952. Since 1998 Hicks Field has served as the home park for the Edenton Steamers of the collegiate summer Coastal Plain League.

Notable people
William Allen (1803–1879), born in Edenton, later governor of Ohio
Penelope Barker (1728–1796), organized first political action by women in the Thirteen Colonies
Robert Brown (born 1960), former NFL defensive end for the Green Bay Packers
Wes Chesson (born 1949), former NFL wide receiver for the Atlanta Falcons and Philadelphia Eagles
Golden Frinks (1920–2004), civil rights leader and SCLC field representative who based his activism around Edenton
Jesse González (born 1995), MLS goalkeeper for the FC Dallas
Joseph Hewes (1730–1779), a signer of the Declaration of Independence, first Secretary of the U.S. Navy
James Iredell (1751–1799), Associate Justice of the U.S. Supreme Court
Harriet Jacobs (1813–1897), abolitionist and author of Incidents in the Life of a Slave Girl, published in 1861 under the pen name of "Linda Brent"
John S. Jacobs (1815–1873), Harriet's brother, abolitionist speaker and author of a short slave narrative
Samuel Johnston (1733–1816), revolutionary leader and first U.S. senator from North Carolina
Zack Valentine (born 1957), Super Bowl-winning Pittsburgh Steelers linebacker; also played for the Philadelphia Eagles
Hugh Williamson (1735–1819), Signer of the United States Constitution and member of the Constitutional Congress
Big Daddy Wilson (born 1960), electric and soul blues singer and songwriter
Adrian H. Wood, educator and writer

References

Further reading
Yellin, Jean Fagan. Harriet Jacobs: A Life. New York: Basic Civitas Books, 2004.  Includes a lot of information on Edenton's antebellum society and economy.

External links

Town website
Edenton-Chowan County Tourism Development Authority
A Guide to Historic Edenton
Edenton Historical Commission
Edenton Police Department

1722 establishments in North Carolina
County seats in North Carolina
Former colonial capitals in North Carolina
Historic Albemarle Tour
Populated places established in 1722
Towns in Chowan County, North Carolina
Capitals of North Carolina